The Pădureni is a right tributary of the Râul Negru in Romania. It discharges into the Râul Negru near Bita.

References

Rivers of Romania
Rivers of Covasna County